The Primera A 2005 season (officially "Torneo Primera A 2005") started in April 2005 resulting Policia Nacional as winners and promoted to Anaprof, while CD Atalanta lost second promotion playoff series against Sporting '89.

Primera A 2005 teams
11 teams participating divided into two groups.

Primera A 2005 Standings
 Group A

 Group B

Green indicates qualified teams for the second round
Red indicates relegation

Hexagonal Round 

Green indicates qualified teams for semifinal round

Final Round

Semifinals 1st leg

Semifinals 2nd leg

Final

Promotion playoff

C.D. Atalanta remain in Primera A''

1st Leg

2nd Leg

References

2006
2
2005–06 in Central American second tier football leagues